"If the South Woulda Won" is a song written and recorded by American musician Hank Williams Jr. It was released in July 1988 as the first single from the album Wild Streak.  The song reached number 8 on the Billboard Hot Country Singles & Tracks chart.

Content
The song is about what Williams Jr. would have done as President of the southern States had the South won the Civil War.  He mentions all the states from the Confederacy as well as Kentucky and includes how he would put his father Hank Williams, Sr. on $100 bills and make Elvis Presley's, Patsy Cline's, and Lynyrd Skynyrd's deaths national holidays.

"If the South Woulda Won" quotes the folk anthem, "Dixie" in the refrain.  At that juncture, Williams considers running for president of the southern states.

List of States mentioned/changes

Chart performance

References

1988 singles
1988 songs
Hank Williams Jr. songs
Songs written by Hank Williams Jr.
Song recordings produced by Barry Beckett
Song recordings produced by Jim Ed Norman
Warner Records singles
Curb Records singles
Songs about the American South